Lomboy may refer to:

Lomboy wine, a Filipino fruit wine
Artemio Lomboy Rillera (1947-2011), Filipino Roman Catholic bishop
Glenda Kapstein Lomboy (1939-2008), Chilean architect

Cebuano-language surnames
Surnames of Chilean origin